The 2018–19 Tampa Bay Lightning season was the 27th season for the National Hockey League (NHL) franchise that was established on December 16, 1991. The team clinched a playoff spot on March 8, 2019, when the Montreal Canadiens lost 8–2 to the Anaheim Ducks. This season marked the first time that Tampa won the Presidents' Trophy in franchise history, winning the Atlantic Division for the second consecutive year as well, their fourth division title overall. They also became the second team in league history to win 62 games, matching the record set by the 1995–96 Detroit Red Wings. Their record-setting season ended abruptly when they became the first Presidents' Trophy winner to get swept in the first round of the Playoffs, losing to the Columbus Blue Jackets. This was also the first time since 2014 that the Lightning were eliminated from the Stanley Cup playoffs in the first round. In addition, this was the second time the Lightning were swept in the first round by a lower seeded team; the first time also being 2014, against the Canadiens.

Off-season

May
On May 23, 2018, the Lightning's 2017–18 season ended when they were defeated by the eventual Stanley Cup champion Washington Capitals in game seven of the Eastern Conference finals. The loss was a 4-0 defeat at Amalie Arena.

On May 31, 2018, the Lightning announced that it was parting ways with assistant coaches Rick Bowness and Brad Lauer. Bowness had been an assistant since 2013. He was responsible for the defense and the penalty kill. Lauer had been a member of the Lighting's coaching staff since 2015.

June
On June 7, 2018, the Lightning announced the re-signing of defensive prospect Daniel Walcott to a one-year contract extension. Walcott spent the entire season with the Syracuse Crunch of the American Hockey League (AHL). Walcot appeared in 62-games, recording five goals and 16 points.

On June 12, 2018, the Lightning announced the re-signing of forward prospect Carter Verhaeghe to a one-year contract extension. Verhaeghe spent his season with the Crunch, where he played in 58 games and scored 17 goals and 48 points.

On June 13, 2018, the Lightning announced backup goaltender Peter Budaj had been traded to the Los Angeles Kings in exchange for forward Andy Andreoff. Andreoff has appeared in 159 NHL games over the last four seasons. During that time, he has 13 goals and 262 career hits.

On June 18, 2018, the Lighting announced the signing of Edward Pasquale to a one-year contract. Pasquale split his season in the AHL between the Syracuse Crunch and the Bakersfield Condors. He was originally acquired by the Lightning via trade with the Edmonton Oilers during the 2017–18 season.

On June 20, 2018, Victor Hedman won the James Norris Memorial Trophy for the 2017–18 NHL season. The award is given annually to the top defenseman that season, which is based upon the votes of the Professional Hockey Writers' Association. Hedman was the first defenseman in Lightning history to win the award. Additionally, Hedman and Nikita Kucherov were named as First Team All-Stars for the season.

On June 22, 2018, the Lightning announced the re-signing of backup goaltender Louis Domingue to a two-year contract extension. Domingue went 7–3–1 over 11 starts with the Lightning. He was acquired by the Lightning during the 2017–18 season in a trade from the Arizona Coyotes.

On the same day, the Lightning named Jeff Halpern as an assistant coach. During the last two seasons, Halpern worked as an assistant coach with the Syracuse Crunch. It was unknown at the time whether the Lightning would be hiring an additional assistant to replace the last remaining vacancy left by the departure of assistants Rick Bowness and Brad Lauer.

On June 24, 2018, the Lightning released the roster for its 2018 Development Camp Roster. The roster consisted of 27 players, which included six of the seven players selected in the 2018 NHL Entry Draft. Six players participating played for the Crunch last season. There were also five forwards participating in the camp as invitees. Notable camp attendees include Cal Foote, Connor Ingram, Boris Katchouk and Taylor Raddysh.

On June 25, 2018, the Lightning issued qualifying offers to Adam Erne, Slater Koekkoek, J. T. Miller and Cedric Paquette, allowing the Lightning to retain those players' playing rights. These rights entail the right match any contract offered to those players after the free agency period begins or draft compensation if the team declines to match the contract offered to the player.

On June 26, 2018, the Lightning announced it had signed forward prospect Ross Colton to a two-year contract. Colton spent the past two seasons playing for the University of Vermont. During that time, Colton led Vermont in goals, scoring 28 goals and 50 points in 69 games. Colton was originally drafted by the Lightning in the fourth round of the 2016 NHL Entry Draft.

It was announced Tom Kurvers had left the Lightning after ten years to become the new assistant general manager of the Minnesota Wild. The last seven years of his tenure with the team had been as a senior advisor to general manager Steve Yzerman. In that capacity, he was based out of Minnesota where he often was at the Wild's arena scouting for the Lightning.

The Lightning announced it had re-signed forward J. T. Miller to a five-year, $26.25 million contract extension. The contract carries a cap hit of $5.25 million per season. Miller skated in 19 games with the Lightning last season, scoring 10 goals and 18 points. Miller was acquired in a trade with the New York Rangers during the 2017–18 season prior to the trade deadline.

Later that day, the Hockey Hall of Fame committee announced the members of the 2018 Hall of Fame class, with former Lightning captain Martin St. Louis announced as a first-ballot induction. St. Louis is the Lightning's record holder in assists (588), points (953), power-play points (300), shorthanded goals (28), shorthanded points (44), game-winning goals (64), overtime goals (10), playoff goals (33) and playoff points (68). He also won the Hart Trophy, Art Ross Trophy (two times), Ted Lindsay Award, NHL Plus-Minus Award, Lady Byng Trophy (three times) and the Stanley Cup while a member of the Lightning.

July
On July 1, 2018, the Lightning announced that it had signed Ryan McDonagh to a 7-year contract extension, which was valued at $47 million. McDonagh had the second highest ice time among Lightning players during the team's trip to the Eastern Conference Final. McDonagh was originally acquired by the Lightning in a trade at the deadline from the New York Rangers.

That same day, the Lightning announced the signing of defenseman Cameron Gaunce to a one-year contract. Guance was originally a draft pick of the Colorado Avalanche in the 2008 draft. Over the course of his career he has appeared in 32 NHL games. Last season he skated in 67 games with the Cleveland Monsters of the American Hockey League.

On July 2, 2018, the Lightning announced the re-signing of defenseman Slater Koekkoek to a one-year contract extension. The contract was valued at $865,000. Koekkoek was originally selected by the Lightning in the 2012 NHL Entry Draft. Koekkoek had four goals and four assists last season for the Lightning in 35-games.

On July 10, 2018, the Lightning announced the re-signing of forward Nikita Kucherov to an eight-year contract extension. The contract is valued at $76 million with an annual cap hit of $9.5 million. The contract is the richest contract in franchise history. Kucherov led the team last season in points (100), goals (39), and assists (61). Kucherov was an NHL-All star last season and was named a first team all-star.

On July 11, 2018, the Lightning announced the re-signing of forward Adam Erne to a one-year contract extension. The contract is valued at $800,000. Last season Erne skated in 23-games with the Lightning, recording three goals and an assist. Erne missed the last half of the season and all of the playoffs due to a lower-body injury.

On July 12, 2018, the Lightning announced the hiring of assistant coach Derek Lalonde. Lalonde served as the head coach of the Iowa Wild of the American Hockey League. Lalonde had previously worked with Lightning head coach Jon Cooper while he was the head coach of the Green Bay Gamblers of the United States Hockey League.

September
On September 11, 2018, Steve Yzerman unexpectedly announced that he was resigning as General Manager after eight seasons, however, he was remaining with the team in an advisory role for the final year of his contract. Assistant General Manager Julien BriseBois replaced Yzerman as general manager. BriseBois had served as assistant general manager since 2010. In that capacity BriseBois also served as general manager of the Norfolk Admirals while they were the Lightning's American Hockey League affiliate, and its current affiliate the Syracuse Crunch.

Training camp

September
On September 14, 2018, the Lightning placed defenseman Jake Dotchin on unconditional waivers with the purpose of terminating his contract. The team said it was due to a material breach of contract. It is believed that the team was unhappy with Dotchin's conditioning at the start of training camp. Dotchin's agent declined to comment, and said they would look to the CBA for any potential remedy.

On September 15, 2018, Jake Dotchin cleared waivers. With no team claiming Dotchin, the Lightning can move forward in the process in terminating his contract.

On September 19, 2018, reports began to surface concerning Jake Dotchin. Elliotte Friedman of Sportsnet reported that Dotchin showed up to camp with his body fat up to as high as 25 percent. Hockey Insider Bob McKenzie of TSN reported the BMI of Dotchin was unconfirmed, but that it was being reported that he showed up to training camp 30 pounds over his playing weight last season. Additionally, McKenzie reported that the National Hockey League Players' Association had become involved in the process. The dispute is set to be heard before an impartial arbitrator to determine whether the Lightning can terminate Dotchin's contract.

That same day the Lightning announced its first round of training camp cuts. All five of the Lightning's training camp invitees were part of the initial cuts. Additionally, the Lightning cut 2018 second-round pick Gabriel Fortier and seventh-round pick Radim Salda. Fortier will re-join the Baie-Comeau Drakkar of the Quebec Major Junior Hockey League. Fortier has played for the Drakkar the past two seasons.

On September 22, 2018, the Lightning claimed forward Danick Martel via waivers from the Philadelphia Flyers. Martel originally joined the Flyers as an undrafted free agent. Martel scored 20+ goals in each of his three seasons in the AHL playing for the Lehigh Valley Phantoms. Last season Martel made his NHL debut with the Flyers, which came over a 4-game stint with the team.

On September 23, 2018, the Lightning made its second round of roster cuts for training camp. The roster cuts brought the Lightning's roster down to 28-players. Of the cuts Gabriel Dumont and Michael Bournival saw limited action with the Lightning last season. Forwards Andy Andreoff, Dumont, Carter Verhaeghe, defenseman Cameron Gaunce, and goaltender Edward Pasquale have to pass through waivers for assignment to the Syracuse Crunch. Prospects Adam Erne, Mathieu Joseph, Alexander Volkov, and Erik Cernak are still with the team.

That same day the team announced that forward Tyler Johnson is considered day-to-day with a lower body injury. Lightning General Manager Julien BriseBois stated that the team was optimistic that Johnson would be ready for the season opener against the Florida Panthers. However, he did concede that it was not a guarantee that Johnson would be ready for that game.

On September 30, 2018, the Lightning announced its third round of roster cuts. Defenseman Eric Cernak and forwards Alexander Volkov and Mitchell Stephens were assigned to the Crunch. The team has not made its official opening night roster announcement. However, it appears that newly acquired forward Danick Martel and 2015 4th round draft pick Mathieu Joseph have made the opening night roster.

October
On October 3, 2018, the Lightning announced its opening night roster. The forward group consists of Anthony Cirelli, Cory Conacher, Adam Erne, Yanni Gourde, Tyler Johnson, Mathieu Joseph, Alex Killorn, Nikita Kucherov, Danick Martel, J. T. Miller, Ondrej Palat, Cedric Paquette, Brayden Point, and Steven Stamkos. The defensemen are Braydon Coburn, Dan Girardi, Victor Hedman, Slater Koekkoek, Ryan McDonagh, Mikhail Sergachev, and Anton Stralman. Andrei Vasilevskiy and Louis Domingue are the Lightning's goaltending tandem.

Standings

Schedule and results

Preseason

|- align="center" bgcolor="ffcccc"
| 1 || September 18 || Carolina Hurricanes || 1–4 ||  || Vasilevskiy || Amalie Arena || 12,454 || 0–1–0 || 
|- align="center" bgcolor="ffcccc"
| 2 || September 19 || @ Carolina Hurricanes || 1–6 ||  || Pasquale || PNC Arena || 6,007 || 0–2–0 || 
|- align="center" bgcolor="ccffcc"
| 3 || September 21 || @ Nashville Predators || 5–1 ||  || Domingue || Bridgestone Arena || 17,342 || 1–2–0 || 
|- align="center" bgcolor="ccffcc"
| 4 || September 22 || Nashville Predators || 5–2 ||  || Ingram || Amalie Arena || 14,457 || 2–2–0 || 
|- align="center" bgcolor="ffcccc"
| 5 || September 25 || Florida Panthers || 2–3 ||  || Vasilevskiy || Amalie Arena || 11,485 || 2–3–0 || 
|- align="center" bgcolor="ccffcc"
| 6 || September 27 || vs. Florida Panthers || 6–2 ||  || Domingue || Amway Center ||  || 3–3–0 || 
|- align="center" bgcolor="ccffcc"
| 7 || September 29 || @ Florida Panthers || 3–2 ||  || Vasilevskiy || BB&T Center || 10,487 || 4–3–0 || 
|-

|-
| Lightning score listed first;

Regular season

|- align="center" bgcolor="ccffcc"
| 1 || October 6 || Florida Panthers || 2–1 || SO || Vasilevskiy || Amalie Arena || 19,092 || 1–0–0 || 2 || 
|- align="center" bgcolor="ffcccc"
| 2 || October 11 || Vancouver Canucks || 1–4 ||  || Vasilevskiy || Amalie Arena || 19,092 || 1–1–0 || 2 || 
|- align="center" bgcolor="ccffcc"
| 3 || October 13 || Columbus Blue Jackets || 8–2 ||  || Vasilevskiy || Amalie Arena || 19,092 || 2–1–0 || 4 || 
|- align="center" bgcolor="ccffcc"
| 4 || October 16 || Carolina Hurricanes || 4–2 ||  || Domingue || Amalie Arena || 19,092 || 3–1–0 || 6 || 
|- align="center" bgcolor="ccffcc"
| 5 || October 18 || Detroit Red Wings || 3–1 ||  || Vasilevskiy || Amalie Arena || 19,092 || 4–1–0 || 8 || 
|- align="center" bgcolor="B0C4DE"
| 6 || October 20 || @ Minnesota Wild || 4–5 || OT || Vasilevskiy || Xcel Energy Center || 19,080 || 4–1–1 || 9 || 
|- align="center" bgcolor="ccffcc"
| 7 || October 21 || @ Chicago Blackhawks || 6–3 ||  || Domingue || United Center || 21,012 || 5–1–1 || 11 || 
|- align="center" bgcolor="ccffcc"
| 8 || October 24 || @ Colorado Avalanche || 1–0 ||  || Vasilevskiy || Pepsi Center || 16,753 || 6–1–1 || 13 || 
|- align="center" bgcolor="ccffcc"
| 9 || October 26 || @ Vegas Golden Knights || 3–2 ||  || Vasilevskiy || T-Mobile Arena || 18,207 || 7–1–1 || 15 || 
|- align="center" bgcolor="ffcccc"
| 10 || October 27 || @ Arizona Coyotes || 1–7 ||  || Domingue || Gila River Arena || 13,623 || 7–2–1 || 15 || 
|- align="center" bgcolor="ccffcc"
| 11 || October 30 || New Jersey Devils || 8–3 ||  || Vasilevskiy || Amalie Arena || 19,092 || 8–2–1 || 17 || 
|-

|- align="center" bgcolor="ffcccc"
| 12 || November 1 || Nashville Predators || 1–4 ||  || Vasilevskiy || Amalie Arena || 19,092 || 8–3–1 || 17 || 
|- align="center" bgcolor="ccffcc"
| 13 || November 3 || @ Montreal Canadiens || 4–1 ||  || Vasilevskiy || Bell Centre || 21,302 || 9–3–1 || 19 || 
|- align="center" bgcolor="ccffcc"
| 14 || November 4 || @ Ottawa Senators || 4–3 || OT || Domingue || Canadian Tire Centre || 11,364 || 10–3–1 || 21 || 
|- align="center" bgcolor="ccffcc"
| 15 || November 6 || Edmonton Oilers || 5–2 ||  || Vasilevskiy || Amalie Arena || 19,092 || 11–3–1 || 23 || 
|- align="center" bgcolor="ccffcc"
| 16 || November 8 || New York Islanders || 4–2 ||  || Vasilevskiy || Amalie Arena || 19,092 || 12–3–1 || 25 || 
|- align="center" bgcolor="ffcccc"
| 17 || November 10 || Ottawa Senators || 4–6 ||  || Vasilevskiy || Amalie Arena || 19,092 || 12–4–1 || 25 || 
|- align="center" bgcolor="ffcccc"
| 18 || November 13 || @ Buffalo Sabres || 1–2 ||  || Domingue || KeyBank Center || 15,833 || 12–5–1 || 25 || 
|- align="center" bgcolor="ccffcc"
| 19 || November 15 || @ Pittsburgh Penguins || 4–3 ||  || Domingue || PPG Paints Arena || 18,422 || 13–5–1 || 27 || 
|- align="center" bgcolor="ccffcc"
| 20 || November 17 || @ Philadelphia Flyers || 6–5 || OT || Domingue || Wells Fargo Center || 19,060 || 14–5–1 || 29 || 
|- align="center" bgcolor="ffcccc"
| 21 || November 19 || @ Nashville Predators || 2–3 ||  || Domingue || Bridgestone Arena || 17,419 || 14–6–1 || 29 || 
|- align="center" bgcolor="ccffcc"
| 22 || November 21 || Florida Panthers || 7–3 ||  || Domingue || Amalie Arena || 19,092 || 15–6–1 || 31 || 
|- align="center" bgcolor="ccffcc"
| 23 || November 23 || Chicago Blackhawks || 4–2 ||  || Domingue || Amalie Arena || 19,092 || 16–6–1 || 33 || 
|- align="center" bgcolor="ccffcc"
| 24 || November 25 || New Jersey Devils || 5–2 ||  || Domingue || Amalie Arena || 19,092 || 17–6–1 || 35 || 
|- align="center" bgcolor="ffcccc"
| 25 || November 27 || Anaheim Ducks || 1–3 ||  || Domingue || Amalie Arena || 19,092 || 17–7–1 || 35 || 
|- align="center" bgcolor="ccffcc"
| 26 || November 29 || Buffalo Sabres || 5–4 ||  || Domingue || Amalie Arena || 19,092 || 18–7–1 || 37 || 
|-

|- align="center" bgcolor="ccffcc"
| 27 || December 1 || @ Florida Panthers || 5–4 || OT || Domingue || BB&T Center || 12,361 || 19–7–1 || 39 || 
|- align="center" bgcolor="ccffcc"
| 28 || December 3 || @ New Jersey Devils || 5–1 ||  || Domingue || Prudential Center || 13,394 || 20–7–1 || 41 || 
|- align="center" bgcolor="ccffcc"
| 29 || December 4 || @ Detroit Red Wings || 6–5 || SO || Pasquale || Little Caesars Arena || 18,477 || 21–7–1 || 43 || 
|- align="center" bgcolor="ccffcc"
| 30 || December 6 || Boston Bruins || 3–2 ||  || Domingue || Amalie Arena || 19,092 || 22–7–1 || 45 || 
|- align="center" bgcolor="ccffcc"
| 31 || December 8 || Colorado Avalanche || 7–1 ||  || Domingue || Amalie Arena || 19,092 || 23–7–1 || 47 || 
|- align="center" bgcolor="ccffcc"
| 32 || December 10 || New York Rangers || 6–3 ||  || Domingue || Amalie Arena || 19,092 || 24–7–1 || 49 || 
|- align="center" bgcolor="ccffcc"
| 33 || December 13 || Toronto Maple Leafs || 4–1 ||  || Vasilevskiy || Amalie Arena || 19,092 || 25–7–1 || 51 || 
|- align="center" bgcolor="B0C4DE"
| 34 || December 16 || @ Winnipeg Jets || 4–5 || OT || Vasilevskiy || Bell MTS Place || 15,321 || 25–7–2 || 52 || 
|- align="center" bgcolor="ccffcc"
| 35 || December 18 || @ Vancouver Canucks || 5–2 ||  || Vasilevskiy || Rogers Arena || 17,193 || 26–7–2 || 54 || 
|- align="center" bgcolor="ccffcc"
| 36 || December 20 || @ Calgary Flames || 5–4 || SO || Domingue || Scotiabank Saddledome || 19,289 || 27–7–2 || 56 || 
|- align="center" bgcolor="ccffcc"
| 37 || December 22 || @ Edmonton Oilers || 6–3 ||  || Vasilevskiy || Rogers Place || 18,347 || 28–7–2 || 58 || 
|- align="center" bgcolor="ccffcc"
| 38 || December 27 || Philadelphia Flyers || 6–5 || OT || Vasilevskiy || Amalie Arena || 19,092 || 29–7–2 || 60 || 
|- align="center" bgcolor="ccffcc"
| 39 || December 29 || Montreal Canadiens || 6–5 ||  || Vasilevskiy || Amalie Arena || 19,092 || 30–7–2 || 62 || 
|- align="center" bgcolor="ccffcc"
| 40 || December 31 || @ Anaheim Ducks || 2–1 || OT || Vasilevskiy || Honda Center || 17,340 || 31–7–2 || 64 || 
|-

|- align="center" bgcolor="ccffcc"
| 41 || January 3 || @ Los Angeles Kings || 6–2 ||  || Vasilevskiy || Staples Center || 17,551 || 32–7–2 || 66 || 
|- align="center" bgcolor="ffcccc"
| 42 || January 5 || @ San Jose Sharks || 2–5 ||  || Vasilevskiy || SAP Center || 17,562 || 32–8–2 || 66 || 
|- align="center" bgcolor="ccffcc"
| 43 || January 8 || Columbus Blue Jackets || 4–0 ||  || Vasilevskiy || Amalie Arena || 19,092 || 33–8–2 || 68 || 
|- align="center" bgcolor="ccffcc"
| 44 || January 10 || Carolina Hurricanes || 3–1 ||  || Vasilevskiy || Amalie Arena || 19,092 || 34–8–2 || 70 || 
|- align="center" bgcolor="ccffcc"
| 45 || January 12 || @ Buffalo Sabres || 5–3 ||  || Domingue || KeyBank Center || 19,070 || 35–8–2 || 72 || 
|- align="center" bgcolor="ffcccc"
| 46 || January 13 || @ New York Islanders || 1–5 ||  || Vasilevskiy || Barclays Center || 11,193 || 35–9–2 || 72 || 
|- align="center" bgcolor="ccffcc"
| 47 || January 15 || @ Dallas Stars || 2–0 ||  || Vasilevskiy || American Airlines Center || 18,021 || 36–9–2 || 74 || 
|- align="center" bgcolor="ffcccc"
| 48 || January 17 || Toronto Maple Leafs || 2–4 ||  || Vasilevskiy || Amalie Arena || 19,092 || 36–10–2 || 74 || 
|- align="center" bgcolor="ccffcc"
| 49 || January 19 || San Jose Sharks || 6–3 ||  || Vasilevskiy || Amalie Arena || 19,092 || 37–10–2 || 76 || 
|- align="center" bgcolor="bbbbbb"
| colspan="11"|All-Star Break (January 24–January 27)
|- align="center" bgcolor="ffcccc"
| 50 || January 30 || @ Pittsburgh Penguins || 2–4 ||  || Vasilevskiy || PPG Paints Arena || 18,514 || 37–11–2 || 76 || 
|-

|- align="center" bgcolor="ccffcc"
| 51 || February 1 || @ New York Islanders || 1–0 || SO || Vasilevskiy || Nassau Coliseum || 13,971 || 38–11–2 || 78 || 
|- align="center" bgcolor="ccffcc"
| 52 || February 2 || @ New York Rangers || 3–2 ||  || Domingue || Madison Square Garden || 17,468 || 39–11–2 || 80 || 
|- align="center" bgcolor="B0C4DE"
| 53 || February 5 || Vegas Golden Knights || 2–3 || SO || Vasilevskiy || Amalie Arena || 19,092 || 39–11–3 || 81 || 
|- align="center" bgcolor="B0C4DE"
| 54 || February 7 || St. Louis Blues || 0–1 || OT || Vasilevskiy || Amalie Arena || 19,092 || 39–11–4 || 82 || 
|- align="center" bgcolor="ccffcc"
| 55 || February 9 || Pittsburgh Penguins || 5–4 ||  || Vasilevskiy || Amalie Arena || 19,092 || 40–11–4 || 84 || 
|- align="center" bgcolor="ccffcc"
| 56 || February 10 || @ Florida Panthers || 5–2 ||  || Domingue || BB&T Center || 13,566 || 41–11–4 || 86 || 
|- align="center" bgcolor="ccffcc"
| 57 || February 12 || Calgary Flames || 6–3 ||  || Vasilevskiy || Amalie Arena || 19,092 || 42–11–4 || 88 || 
|- align="center" bgcolor="ccffcc"
| 58 || February 14 || Dallas Stars || 6–0 ||  || Vasilevskiy || Amalie Arena || 19,092 || 43–11–4 || 90 || 
|- align="center" bgcolor="ccffcc"
| 59 || February 16 || Montreal Canadiens || 3–0 ||  || Vasilevskiy || Amalie Arena || 19,092 || 44–11–4 || 92 || 
|- align="center" bgcolor="ccffcc"
| 60 || February 18 || @ Columbus Blue Jackets || 5–1 ||  || Vasilevskiy || Nationwide Arena || 16,411 || 45–11–4 || 94 || 
|- align="center" bgcolor="ccffcc"
| 61 || February 19 || @ Philadelphia Flyers || 5–2 ||  || Domingue || Wells Fargo Center || 18,932 || 46–11–4 || 96 || 
|- align="center" bgcolor="ccffcc"
| 62 || February 21 || Buffalo Sabres || 2–1 || SO || Vasilevskiy || Amalie Arena || 19,092 || 47–11–4 || 98 || 
|- align="center" bgcolor="ccffcc"
| 63 || February 25 || Los Angeles Kings || 4–3 || SO || Vasilevskiy || Amalie Arena || 19,092 || 48–11–4 || 100 || 
|- align="center" bgcolor="ccffcc"
| 64 || February 27 || @ New York Rangers || 4–3 || OT || Vasilevskiy || Madison Square Garden || 17,012 || 49–11–4 || 102 || 
|- align="center" bgcolor="ffcccc"
| 65 || February 28 || @ Boston Bruins || 1–4 ||  || Domingue || TD Garden || 17,565 || 49–12–4 || 102 || 
|-

|- align="center" bgcolor="ccffcc"
| 66 || March 2 || Ottawa Senators || 5–1 ||  || Vasilevskiy || Amalie Arena || 19,092 || 50–12–4 || 104 || 
|- align="center" bgcolor="ccffcc"
| 67 || March 5 || Winnipeg Jets || 5–2 ||  || Vasilevskiy || Amalie Arena || 19,092 || 51–12–4 || 106 || 
|- align="center" bgcolor="ffcccc"
| 68 || March 7 || Minnesota Wild || 0–3 ||  || Vasilevskiy || Amalie Arena || 19,092 || 51–13–4 || 106 || 
|- align="center" bgcolor="ccffcc"
| 69 || March 9 || Detroit Red Wings || 3–2 ||  || Domingue || Amalie Arena || 19,092 || 52–13–4 || 108 || 
|- align="center" bgcolor="ccffcc"
| 70 || March 11 || @ Toronto Maple Leafs || 6–2 ||  || Vasilevskiy || Scotiabank Arena || 19,491 || 53–13–4 || 110 || 
|- align="center" bgcolor="ccffcc"
| 71 || March 14 || @ Detroit Red Wings || 5–4 ||  || Vasilevskiy || Little Caesars Arena || 19,515 || 54–13–4 || 112 || 
|- align="center" bgcolor="ccffcc"
| 72 || March 16 || Washington Capitals  || 6–3 ||  || Vasilevskiy || Amalie Arena || 19,092 || 55–13–4 || 114 || 
|- align="center" bgcolor="ccffcc"
| 73 || March 18 || Arizona Coyotes || 4–1 ||  || Vasilevskiy || Amalie Arena || 19,092 || 56–13–4 || 116 || 
|- align="center" bgcolor="ccffcc"
| 74 || March 20 || @ Washington Capitals || 5–4 || OT || Vasilevskiy || Capital One Arena || 18,506 || 57–13–4 || 118 || 
|- align="center" bgcolor="ccffcc"
| 75 || March 21 || @ Carolina Hurricanes || 6–3 ||  || Domingue || PNC Arena || 13,785 || 58–13–4 || 120 || 
|- align="center" bgcolor="ffcccc"
| 76 || March 23 || @ St. Louis Blues || 3–4 ||  || Vasilevskiy || Enterprise Center || 18,127 || 58–14–4 || 120 || 
|- align="center" bgcolor="ccffcc"
| 77 || March 25 || Boston Bruins || 5–4 ||  || Vasilevskiy || Amalie Arena || 19,092 || 59–14–4 || 122 || 
|- align="center" bgcolor="ffcccc"
| 78 || March 30 || Washington Capitals || 3–6 ||  || Vasilevskiy || Amalie Arena || 19,092 || 59–15–4 || 122 || 
|-

|- align="center" bgcolor="ccffcc"
| 79 || April 1 || @ Ottawa Senators || 5–2 ||  || Vasilevskiy || Canadian Tire Centre || 13,628 || 60–15–4 || 124 || 
|- align="center" bgcolor="ffcccc"
| 80 || April 2 || @ Montreal Canadiens|| 2–4 ||  || Pasquale || Bell Centre || 21,302 || 60–16–4 || 124 || 
|- align="center" bgcolor="ccffcc"
| 81 || April 4 || @ Toronto Maple Leafs || 3–1 ||  || Vasilevskiy || Scotiabank Arena || 19,400 || 61–16–4 || 126 || 
|- align="center" bgcolor="ccffcc"
| 82 || April 6 || @ Boston Bruins || 6–3 ||  || Pasquale || TD Garden || 17,565 || 62–16–4 || 128 || 
|-

|-
| Lightning score listed first;

Playoffs

|- align="center" bgcolor="ffcccc"
| 1 || April 10 || Columbus Blue Jackets || 3–4 ||  || Vasilevskiy || Amalie Arena || 19,092 || 0–1 || 
|- align="center" bgcolor="ffcccc"
| 2 || April 12 || Columbus Blue Jackets || 1–5 ||  || Vasilevskiy || Amalie Arena || 19,092 || 0–2 || 
|- align="center" bgcolor="ffcccc"
| 3 || April 14 || @ Columbus Blue Jackets || 1–3 ||  || Vasilevskiy || Nationwide Arena || 19,224 || 0–3 || 
|- align="center" bgcolor="ffcccc"
| 4 || April 16 || @ Columbus Blue Jackets || 3–7 ||  || Vasilevskiy || Nationwide Arena || 19,328 || 0–4 || 
|-

|- 
| Lightning score listed first;

Player stats
Final

Skaters

Goaltenders

†Denotes player spent time with another team before joining Tampa Bay.  Stats reflect time with Tampa Bay only.
‡Traded from Tampa Bay mid-season.
Bold/italics denotes franchise record

Suspensions/fines

Awards and honours

Awards

Milestones

Transactions
The Lightning have been involved in the following transactions during the 2018–19 season.

Trades

Free agents

Waivers

Contract terminations

Retirement

Signings

Draft picks

Below are the Tampa Bay Lightning's selections at the 2018 NHL Entry Draft, which was held on June 22 and 23, 2018, at the American Airlines Center in Dallas, Texas.

Notes:
 The Los Angeles Kings' seventh-round pick went to the Tampa Bay Lightning as the result of a trade on May 31, 2017, that sent Bokondji Imama to Los Angeles in exchange for this pick (being conditional at the time of the trade).

References

Tampa Bay Lightning seasons
Tampa Bay Lightning
Tampa Bay Lightning
Tampa Bay Lightning
Presidents' Trophy seasons